Hanne Høegh Poulsen (born 25 January or 25 February 1981) is a Danish taekwondo practitioner. She won a gold medal at the 1998 European Taekwondo Championships, and a bronze medal at the 2000 European Championships. She placed 4th in flyweight at the 2000 Summer Olympics in Sydney, where she was defeated by eventual gold medalist Lauren Burns in the semifinal, and was defeated by Chi Shu-ju in the bronze final.

References

External links

1981 births
Living people
Danish female taekwondo practitioners
Olympic taekwondo practitioners of Denmark
Taekwondo practitioners at the 2000 Summer Olympics
European Taekwondo Championships medalists